Stefan Wagner is a management researcher focusing on technological change and the economics of innovation and new technology. He is a professor at European School of Management and Technology, where he also serves as Director of PhD Studies.

Career 
Stefan Wagner got his doctorate (Dr. oec. publ.) and his habilitation from LMU Munich. Afterwards he became a professor at ESMT Berlin. He has been a founding member and also the president (2018/2019) of EPIP European Policy for Intellectual Property Association, where he currently serves on the board. Stefan also is a board member of the Berlin School of Economics.

His scholarly work has been published in a wide range of top academic journals in management and economics such as the Academy of Management Journal, Management Science, Strategic Management Journal or The Review of Economics and Statistics. In addition to his scholarly work, Stefan frequently serves as a keynote speaker and has delivered a TEDx talk on how institutional uncertainty affects R&D investments in 2021.

Books 
 Fischl, B. and S. Wagner (2016). Der perfekte Businessplan: So überzeugen Sie Banken und Investoren. 3rd Edition. Beck München.
 Wagner, S. (2007). Economic Analyses of the European Patent System. DUV Gabler.

Awards and recognition 
 Fulbright Scholarship (2001/2002)
 TUSIAD – TCCI Chair: European Economic Integration (2014–2016)
 Recipient of Jürgen-Hauschildt-Award of the Technology, Innovation and Entrepreneurship section of the VHB - German Academic Association for Business Research for the best research publication in innovation management, 2018.

References

External links 

1976 births
Living people
Academic staff of the European School of Management and Technology
German scientists
Management scientists